Dhammapāla was the name of two or more great Theravada Buddhist commentators.

Extracts from the latter work, and the whole of three out of the seven others, have been published in Pali by the Pali Text Society. These works show great learning, exegetical skill and sound judgment. But as to the meaning of words, or to discussions of the ethical import of his texts, very little can be gathered from his writings of value for the social history of his time. Though in all probability a Tamil by birth, he declares, in the opening lines of those of his works that have been edited, that he followed the tradition of the Great Monastery (Maha Vihara) at Anuradhapura in Sri Lanka, and the works themselves confirm this in every respect.

Another writer, probably also called Dhammapala, since he was supposed by the 12th century to be the same, though scholars do not accept this, wrote subcommentaries on the commentaries on the Digha, Majjhima and Samyutta Nikayas.

A third Dhammapala wrote Saccasankhepa, a handbook of abhidhamma.

Sources
 Edmund Hardy in Zeitschrift der deutschen morgenlandischen Gesellschaft (1898), pp. 97 foll.
 Netti-ppakaranam: The guide, according to Kaccana Thera (ed. E. Hardy, London, Pali Text Society, 1902, ASIN B0000CLJ95), especially the Introduction, passim
Theri Gatha Commentary, Peta Vatthu Commentary, and Vimna Vutthu Commentary, all three published by the Pali Text Society.
 K.R. Norman, Pali Literature, Otto Harrassowitz, Wiesbaden, 1983
 Oskar von Hinüber, Handbook of Pali Literature, Walter de Gruyter, Berlin, 1996

References

5th-century Buddhist monks
Indian scholars of Buddhism
Buddhism amongst Tamils